The Bolivarian Republic of Venezuela was a founding member of the International Monetary Fund (IMF) in 1946.

Venezuela's economy 
Venezuela's economy is highly dependent on oil production and exportation. Venezuela is a member of the Organization of Petroleum Exporting Countries. Its economy is prone to disruption given that price of oil fluctuates rapidly. In 2014, oil prices dropped. Since then Venezuela has had to adapt to a significant decrease in state revenue. The economy has contracted each quarter since then. This caused Venezuela's Central Bank's monetary reserves to decline as well. A severe shortage of goods followed, with necessities such as medical supplies in short supply. Since 2007, Venezuela has not had official financial relations with either the IMF or the World Bank after it paid off its debt five years ahead of schedule under President Hugo Chávez. The IMF and World Bank have stated their readiness to offer assistance if called upon.

Venezuela has nationalized many industries, specifically in oil production, banking, telecommunications, metallurgy and mining. The high price of oil in recent decades allowed the government to embark on ambitious public programs, paid for by oil revenues when prices were high. Due to such measures and through redistributive policies the poverty rate was cut from 50 percent in 1998 to 30 percent in 2013, based on state figures. Inequality, as measured by the Gini Index, was reduced.

Statistics 
The per capita income of Venezuela was $7,808 as of 2015. According to IMF data, since 2013 the economy has shrunk by 30%. Predictions in 2017 stated inflation was expected to reach 720% in 2017, and the economy was forecasted to contract by an additional 7.4%. The official exchange rate is severely overvalued, such that the black market value of the Bolivar is significantly less than the government rate of 10 bolivars to $1 USD. This has affected the ability of the economy to remain viable. As of 2016, Venezuela, in spite of having symbolically walked away, still has an IMF quota allocation of 3,722,700 SDR.

References 

Economy of Venezuela
International Monetary Fund relations